The Khalmyer Bay, also known as Gydan Bay is a bay on the Siberian coast in the Kara Sea. It is located in the Gyda Peninsula and it is roughly 185 km long and 47 km wide at its widest point. Lat 71°30′ N, long 76° E.

Geography
This deep bay lies between the large estuaries of the Ob (Gulf of Ob) and the Yenisei River. The peninsula formed between this bay and neighbouring Yuratski Bay is known as the Mamonta Peninsula (Poluostrov Mamonta, meaning 'Mammoth Peninsula') and the narrow peninsula in the NW formed between this bay and the neighbouring Gulf of Ob is known as the Yavay Peninsula (Poluostrov Yavay).

The Khalmyer Bay is surrounded by tundra coast and there are numerous river mouths on its shores. Deep within the bay lies the settlement of Gyda. At its mouth lie the settlements of Matyuysale and Mongatalyang.

This Bay is located in the Yamal-Nenets autonomous district administrative region of the Russian Federation.

The Khalmyer Bay appears also as Gydanskaya Guba ('Gyda Bay') in maps in Russian.

References

External links
 Location

Bays of the Kara Sea
Bays of Russia
Bodies of water of Yamalo-Nenets Autonomous Okrug